"Can I Live?" is a song by American R&B singer Sisqó, released in May 2001 as the lead single from his second studio album Return of Dragon (2001). It was written and produced by Sisqó and Teddy Riley. "The Dragon Family" and R&B group LovHer appear on the track as guest vocalists. "Can I Live?" only managed to peak at number 72 on the Billboard Hot R&B/Hip-Hop Songs chart, but was a minor chart success in Germany.

Music video
Directed by Dave Meyers, the video takes place in a nightclub where Sisqó attracts women with his dancing.

Live performances
Sisqó performed the song live at the inaugural BET Awards in Las Vegas on June 19, 2001.

Track listing

Charts

References 

2001 singles
2001 songs
Sisqó songs
Jive Records singles
Music videos directed by Dave Meyers (director)
Song recordings produced by Teddy Riley
Songs written by Richard Stannard (songwriter)
Songs written by Teddy Riley